Changxingia is a genus of prehistoric lobe-finned fish that belonged to the coelacanth family Mawsoniidae. It lived during the Late Permian in Zhejiang, southern China. It contains two species, C. aspiratilis (the type species) and C. weii, which were named in 1981 and 1997 from specimens found at the same locality. They are the first Permian marine coelacanths found in Asia.

References 

Permian bony fish
Late Permian fish
Prehistoric lobe-finned fish genera
Prehistoric animals of China